James Ogilvy, 4th Earl of Findlater and 1st Earl of Seafield,  (11 July 166419 August 1730) was a Scottish politician.

Life

Findlater was the 2nd son of James Ogilvy, 3rd Earl of Findlater and Lady Anne Montgomerie, a daughter of Hugh Montgomerie, 7th Earl of Eglinton.

He was elected to the Faculty of Advocates in 1685, and was a Commissioner to the Parliament of Scotland for Cullen, Banffshire from 1681 to 1682 and from 1689 to 1695. Although in the Convention Parliament of 1689 he had spoken for James II, he took the oath of allegiance to William and Mary, and after filling some minor official positions he was appointed to senior roles. Upon his royal appointment as Secretary of State in 1696 he relinquished his representation of Cullen and continued in parliament instead by right of his office. Findlater was Solicitor General for Scotland from 1693, Lord Chancellor of Scotland from 1702 to 1704 and from 1705 to 1708, Secretary of State from 1696 to 1702 and joint secretary from 1704 to 1705. He was elected a Fellow of the Royal Society in 1698.

Findlater was created Viscount Seafield in 1698 and Earl of Seafield in 1701. He was a Commissioner for the Union from 1702 and an active promoter of the Union from 1706. He served as first Lord Chief Baron of the Scottish Court of Exchequer, established by the Act of Union. By 1713 his views on Union had changed and he moved for its repeal.

He sat in the British House of Lords as a Scottish Representative Peer from 1707 to 1710, from 1712 to 1715 and from 1722 to 1730. Findlater was admitted to the Privy Council of Great Britain in 1707 and was appointed Lord Chief Baron in the Court of Exchequer in 1707. In 1711 he succeeded his father as fourth Earl of Findlater. He served as Keeper of the Great Seal of Scotland from 1713 to 1714.

Lord Findlater married Anne Dunbar, daughter of Sir William Dunbar, 1st Baronet, in 1687. He died in August 1730, aged 66, and was succeeded by his son James Ogilvy, 5th Earl of Findlater.

References

External links
Article with biographical notes

1664 births
1730 deaths
Keepers of the Great Seal of Scotland
Lord chancellors of Scotland
Earls of Findlater
Scottish representative peers
Members of the pre-1707 Parliament of Scotland
Members of the Privy Council of Scotland
Members of the Privy Council of Great Britain
Lords High Commissioner to the General Assembly of the Church of Scotland
Members of the Faculty of Advocates
Politics of the county of Banff
Scottish unionists
Earls of Seafield
Peers of Scotland created by William II
Commissioners of the Treasury of Scotland
Solicitors General for Scotland
Barons of the Court of Exchequer (Scotland)
Findlater
Fellows of the Royal Society
Knights of the Thistle